Maëva Contion (born 31 May 1992 at Creil) is a French athlete, who specializes in the 400 meters hurdles.

Biography  
Junior Champion of France in 2010 and 2011, she won the bronze medal at the 2011 European Junior Championships where she ran 58.03.  She was champion of France U23s in 2012 and 2014.

In 2015, at Villeneuve d'Ascq she won the French Elite Championships in 56.03, a personal best.

Prize list

International competitions

National 
 French Championships in Athletics   :  
 winner of the 400m hurdles in 2015  ;  2nd in 2014

Records

References

External links  
 

1992 births
Living people
French female hurdlers